Smokowo may refer to the following villages in Poland:
Smokowo, Pomeranian Voivodeship
Smokowo, Warmian-Masurian Voivodeship